Ravensburg is an electoral constituency (German: Wahlkreis) represented in the Bundestag. It elects one member via first-past-the-post voting. Under the current constituency numbering system, it is designated as constituency 294. It is located in southeastern Baden-Württemberg, comprising most of the district of Ravensburg.

Ravensburg was created for the inaugural 1949 federal election. It was abolished in 1980 and re-established in the 2009 federal election. Since 2017, it has been represented by Axel Müller of the Christian Democratic Union (CDU).

Geography
Ravensburg is located in southeastern Baden-Württemberg. As of the 2021 federal election, it comprises the district of Ravensburg excluding the municipalities of Aichstetten, Aitrach, Bad Wurzach, Kißlegg.

History
Ravensburg was created in 1949. In the 1949 election, it was Württemberg-Hohenzollern constituency 6 in the numbering system. In the 1953 through 1961 elections, it was number 195. In the 1965 through 1976 elections, it was number 199. Originally, the constituency comprised the districts of Ravensburg, Wangen, and Tettnang. In the 1965 through 1976 elections, it also contained the municipality of Achberg from the Sigmaringen district and the Adelsreute municipality from the Überlingen district.

Ravensburg was abolished in the 1980 election. Its area was divided between the new constituency of Ravensburg – Bodensee and the redistributed constituency of Biberach.

Ravensburg was re-established in the 2009 election. Its constituency number and borders have not changed since its re-establishment.

Members
The constituency has been held continuously by the Christian Democratic Union (CDU) throughout both its incarnations. It was first represented by Kurt Georg Kiesinger from 1949 to 1961, followed by Eduard Adorno from 1961 to 1972. Claus Jäger was representative from 1972 until the constituency's abolition in 1980. After its re-establishment, it was represented by Andreas Schockenhoff from 2009 until his death in 2014. Axel Müller was elected in 2017.

Election results

2021 election

2017 election

2013 election

2009 election

References

Federal electoral districts in Baden-Württemberg
1949 establishments in West Germany
2009 establishments in Germany
Constituencies established in 1949
Constituencies established in 2009
Ravensburg (district)